The Orient/East-Med Corridor is the number 4 of the ten priority axes of the Trans-European Transport Network (TEN-T).

Description
This corridor will connect central Europe with the maritime interfaces of the North, Baltic, Black and Mediterranean Seas.

 Hamburg–Berlin
 Rostock–Berlin–Dresden
 Bremerhaven/Wilhelmshaven–Magdeburg–Dresden
 Dresden–Ústí nad Labem–Mělník/Prague–Kolín
 Kolín–Pardubice–Brno–Vienna/Bratislava–Budapest–Arad–Timișoara–Craiova–Calafat–Vidin–Sofia
 Sofia–Plovdiv–Burgas
 Plovdiv–Turkey border
 Sofia–Thessaloniki–Athens–Limassol–Nicosia
 Athens–Patras/Igoumenitsa

References

External links
 Trans-European Transport Network (TEN-T) at European Union official web site
 Orient - East Med at European Union official web site

Transport and the European Union
TEN-T Core Network Corridors